Washington News Desk was a short-lived 1990s radio news network offering a five-minute newscast at the top of the hour.

History
The network, owned by Pat Robertson, was marketed to individual stations under the brand "StandardNews", beginning in 1991.  The network was made available to stations on a barter-for-inventory basis.  The commercial inventory, as well as most of the news content itself, contained a pro-Christian slant, mirroring that of rival USA Radio News.

See also
 List of United States radio networks

Defunct radio networks in the United States

Radio stations established in 1991